Płonka is a river in the centre of Poland, right-bank tributary of Wkra. The total length of the river amounts to 42.6 km. Source of Płonka is located in the vicinity of the village of Staroźreby, mouth near the village of Kołoząb.

Tributaries
 Dzierzążnica
 Żurawianka

See also
 Rivers of Poland

Rivers of Poland
Rivers of Masovian Voivodeship